The Gibraltar World Music Festival (GWMF) is an annual music festival held in the British Overseas Territory of Gibraltar. The event has a different theme every year, past themes have been Sephardic, Asia minor, China and India, Maghreb,  Morocco, Lusophone Culture and Afreeka.

In 2016, the theme was the Portuguese language (Lusophone) year and called Obrigado, meaning thank you in Portuguese, with Artists from Portugal, Brazil and Cape Verde. Tickets for the event were sold at £30 (General Public) & £25 (Senior Citizens and Students) for the event in St. Michael's Cave.

In 2017 the theme will be Africa and called Uprising.

Music Concert Line ups 

 2012: SEPHARDIC DIVAS - Sarah Aroeste, OFIR, Françoise Atlan, Mor Karbasi
 2013: PASSAGE TO ASIA - En Chordais, The Sweet Canary Ensemble, Mark Eliyahu, Amir Shahzad, Yasmin Levy
 2014: CHINDIA - Nathan Conroy, Itamar Doari, Nitin Sawhney, Mieko Miyazaki, Guo Gan
 2015: KHAMSA - Dhafer Youssef, David Morales, Jazz Oil, Abir El Abed, Neta Elkayam, Françoise Atlan.
 2016: OBRIGADO - Carmen Souza, Márcio Faraco & Carminho
 2017: UPRISING - Bassekou Kouyaté, Gili Yalo and Yossi Fine and Ben Aylon
 2018: BORDERS- Quarter to Africa and Orphy Robinson and the Voicestra Polyphonic Collective

Gallery

References

External links 
2016 Gibraltar World Music Festival official site
2017 Gibraltar World Music Festival official site

See also
 Gibraltar Music Festival

2012 establishments in Gibraltar
Music festivals in Europe
Gibraltarian culture
Festivals in Gibraltar
Music festivals established in 2012
Music festivals in Gibraltar